Bismuth subcarbonate (BiO)2CO3, sometimes written Bi2O2(CO3) is a chemical compound of bismuth containing both oxide and carbonate anions. Bismuth is in the +3 oxidation state. Bismuth subcarbonate occurs naturally as the mineral bismutite. Its structure consists of Bi–O layers and CO3 layers and is related to kettnerite, CaBi(CO3)OF. It is light-sensitive.

Uses
It is highly radiopaque and for example is used as a filler in radiopaque catheters which can be seen by x-ray. In modern medicine, bismuth subcarbonate has been made into nanotube arrays that exhibit antibacterial properties. It is also used in fireworks to make Dragon's eggs. It is a constituent of milk of bismuth which was a popular digestive tract panacea in the 1930s.

Safety
Bismuth subcarbonate may be harmful if swallowed. It may irritate the respiratory and gastrointestinal tract.

Synthesis  
Bismuth subcarbonate can be attained from the reaction between bismuth nanoparticles and the atmospheric carbon dioxide (CO2) dissolved in water. Bismuth subcarbonate has the tendency to form nanoplates, but it can be also obtained as small round nanospheres (with controlled size) when it is grown in the presence of halloysite nanotubes. The high pH and high temperature of the aqueous solution helps to reduce the time of synthesis. It is readily formed on the surface of undoped bismuth oxide (β-Bi2O3 and γ-Bi2O3) nanoparticles even when they are not suspended in water.

Structure  
Bismuth subcarbonate has a structure with a tetragonal unit cell. Layers of (BiO)n positively charged, and carbonate anion (CO32-) are surrounding both sides of the (BiO) layer to compensate the charge. Usually, The (BiO)'n'' layer grows perpendicular to the b axis.

References

External links
Source of the common name; milk of bismuth
MSDS

Bismuth compounds
Carbonates